Spirit Black is the sixth studio album by Jørn Lande's solo project Jorn.

Lande describes the album as "a crossover between The Duke and Lonely Are the Brave". He says that "The musical style and direction is now more defined and less experimental". He also says that the fans "can expect a solid and defined record".

Track listing

Personnel
Jørn Lande - lead vocals
Tore Moren - guitars
Jimmy Iversen - guitars
Sid Ringsby - bass
Willy Bendiksen - drums

Additional personnel
Igor Gianola - guitars on "City In between", "I Walk Alone" and "The Sun Goes Down"
Espen Mjoen - bass on "City In between" and "The Sun Goes Down"
Nic Angileri - bass on "I Walk Alone"
Jon Berg - additional guitars on "Rock'n'Roll Angel"
Tommy Hansen - keyboards

Release history

References 

2009 albums
Frontiers Records albums
Jørn Lande albums